South Terrace is one of the four terraces which bound the city centre of Adelaide, the capital of South Australia.

It is the southern edge of the city centre, and is bounded by the Adelaide parklands to the south, including Veale Gardens and Adelaide Himeji Garden.

South Terrace runs east from the intersection of West Terrace, Anzac Highway and Goodwood Road. Other major intersections are with King William Street/Peacock Road, where the Glenelg tram line crosses, and the intersection of Pulteney Street and Glen Osmond Road.

Adelaide Trades Hall and Pulteney Grammar School are located on South Terrace, as is a large office tower owned by Optus.

See also

References

 
Streets in Adelaide